Richard Twum Aninakwah is a retired Ghanaian Supreme Court Judge. He served on the Supreme Court bench from 2004 to 2008.

Biography
Aninakwah was born on 28 January 1938. He had his secondary education at Prempeh College and was a contemporary of John Agyekum Kufuor, former President of the Republic of Ghana while at the school.

He was nominated in 2004 and was vetted on Wednesday, 15 September 2004. He was sworn into office together with Justice Felix Michael Lartey and Mr Justice Julius Ansah  on Friday 15 October 2004. He retired on 28 January 2008 at the mandatory retirement age of seventy (70) years.

See also
 List of judges of the Supreme Court of Ghana
 Supreme Court of Ghana

References

1938 births
Living people
Justices of the Supreme Court of Ghana